"The Weekend" is a song by British DJ Michael Gray, featuring vocals from English singer Shèna. It was released in the United Kingdom on 1 November 2004 and peaked at number seven on the UK Singles Chart, topped the UK and Hungarian dance charts, and reached the top 20 in several other countries, including Australia, Italy, and the Netherlands. A music video directed by Mike Harris was made for the song.

Composition
"The Weekend" contains in the hook a sample from "Back at Ya", a 1984 single by American group Kerr, who was completely replayed at Scorccio Sample Replays. The track also uses the lyric "I can't wait for Saturday to begin", from the 1983 song "Get Down Saturday Night" by American singer Oliver Cheatham, but changing the word "Saturday" with "the weekend". Cheatham is credited as co-writer, accordingly.

Track listings

UK CD single
 "The Weekend" (radio edit)
 "The Weekend" (extended vocal mix)
 "The Weekend" (original 12-inch mix)
 "The Weekend" (Nic Fanciulli vocal mix)
 "The Weekend" (video)

UK 12-inch single 1
A. "The Weekend" (extended vocal mix)
B. "The Weekend" (original 12-inch mix)

UK 12-inch single 2
A. "The Weekend" (Nic Fanciulli vocal mix)
B. "The Weekend" (Nic Fanciulli dub mix)

German, Austrian, and Swiss CD single
 "The Weekend" (radio mix) – 3:12
 "The Weekend" (vocal 12-inch version) – 8:09
 "The Weekend" (original 12-inch version) – 7:52
 "The Weekend" (Nic Fanciulli vocal mix) – 8:52
 "The Weekend" (Da Loop Brothers Meets Sunloverz remix) – 6:49
 "The Weekend" (video) – 3:12

Australian CD single
 "The Weekend" (radio edit)
 "The Weekend" (extended vocal mix)
 "The Weekend" (original 12-inch mix)
 "The Weekend" (Nic Fanciulli vocal mix)

Charts

Weekly charts

Year-end charts

Certifications

References

2004 songs
2004 singles
Columbia Records singles
Songs about occupations
Songs written by Jim Irvin
Universal Records singles